The 2014 National Lacrosse League Entry Draft was the 27th annual meeting of the National Lacrosse League (NLL) franchises to select newly eligible box lacrosse players to the leagues rosters. It was hosted by the Toronto Rock at the Toronto Rock Athletic Centre on September 22, 2014. A total off 55 players were selected in the draft with the Edmonton Rush selecting first overall for the first time in three years. The draft was also televised online on YouTube.

Overview
The following is the breakdown of the 55 players selected by Box Lacrosse positions:

Determination of draft order
The draft order is based generally on each team's record from the previous season, with teams which qualified for the postseason selecting after those which failed to make the playoffs.

Draft

Round 1

Round 2

Round 3

Round 4

Round 5

Round 6

^ Compensatory Pick

References

National Lacrosse League Entry Draft
National Lacrosse League
National Lacrosse League Entry Draft
National Lacrosse League Entry Draft